The 2015–16 season was Norwich City's return to the Premier League after gaining promotion via the play-offs in the previous season, in their 113th year in existence. This season Norwich City participated in the Premier League, FA Cup and League Cup. The season covered the period from 1 July 2015 to 30 June 2016.

Transfers

Transfers in

Total spending: £12,500,000

Transfers out

Total spending: £15,000,000

Loans in

Loans out

Competitions

Pre-season friendlies
On 6 June 2015, Norwich City announced they would host West Ham United to mark Carrow Road's 80th anniversary. This fixture was the first ever played at Carrow Road; Norwich won the game 4–3. Two days later, the Canaries announced their pre-season schedule.
Norwich City announced on 6 July 2015, that they would be playing FC Augsburg and Maccabi Haifa in a pre-season training camp in Germany and Austria.

Premier League

League table

Results by matchday

Results summary

Matches
The Premier League fixture list was released on 17 June 2015. Norwich's first game was at home to Crystal Palace.

League Cup
Norwich City entered the competition in the second round and were given an away trip to Rotherham United. The third round draw was made on 25 August 2015 live on Sky Sports by Charlie Nicholas and Phil Thompson. Norwich City drew West Bromwich Albion at home.

FA Cup
Norwich City entered the competition in the third round and were drawn at home to Manchester City.

Statistics

Appearances, goals and cards
Sources:
Players with no appearances not included in the list.

Goalscorers

References

Norwich City
Norwich City F.C. seasons